Tabanus trimaculatus is a species of horse fly in the family Tabanidae.

Distribution
United States.

References

Tabanidae
Insects described in 1809
Taxa named by Palisot de Beauvois
Diptera of North America